The Originals, an American supernatural drama, was renewed for a second season by The CW on February 13, 2014 and it premiered on October 6, 2014.

Cast

Main 
 Joseph Morgan as Niklaus "Klaus" Mikaelson
 Daniel Gillies as Elijah Mikaelson 
 Phoebe Tonkin as Hayley Marshall 
 Charles Michael Davis as Marcellus "Marcel" Gerard 
 Leah Pipes as Camille "Cami" O'Connell 
 Danielle Campbell as Davina Claire 
 Yusuf Gatewood as Vincent Griffith (possessed by Finn Mikaelson; himself)

Recurring 
 Nathan Parsons as Jackson Kenner 
 Colin Woodell as Aiden
 Maisie Richardson-Sellers as Eva Sinclair (possessed by Rebekah Mikaelson; herself) 
 Daniel Sharman as Kaleb Westphall (possessed by Kol Mikaelson) 
 Nishi Munshi as Gia 
 Riley Voelkel as Freya Mikaelson 
 Steven Krueger as Joshua "Josh" Rosza 
 Sebastian Roché as Mikael 
 Sonja Sohn as Lenore Shaw (herself; possessed by Esther) 
 Chase Coleman as Oliver 
 Claudia Black as Dahlia 
 Natalie Dreyfuss as Cassie (possessed by Esther; herself) 
 Debra Mooney as Mary Dumas 
 Meg Foster as Josephine LaRue 
 Kristin Erickson as Dahlia (young) 
 Alice Evans as Esther 
 Hayley McCarthy as Esther (young) 
 Yohance Myles as Joe Dalton 
 Nathaniel Buzolic as Kol Mikaelson 
 Aiden Flowers as Klaus Mikaelson (young) 
 Perry Cox as Elijah Mikaelson (young) 
 Callie McClincy as Rebekah Mikaelson (young) 
 Tanner Fontana as Nick 
 Lloyd Owen as Ansel 
 Elle Graham as Freya Mikaelson (young) 
 Javier Carrasquillo as Kurt

Special guest 
 Claire Holt as Rebekah Mikaelson 
 Nina Dobrev as Tatia

Guest 
 Peta Sergeant as Francesca Correa 
 McCarrie McCausland as Marcel Gerard (young) 
 Voltaire Council as Finn Mikaelson (teen) 
 Isaiah Stratton as Mikael (young) 
 Cade Weeks as Finn Mikaelson (child) 
 Keri Lynn Pratt as Mary-Alice Claire 
 Aleeah Rogers as Astrid Malchance 
 Adam Fristoe as Ruben Morris 
 Nate Lycan as Mathias 
 Kinsey Kunkel as Dahlia (child) 
 Morgan Hinkleman as Esther (child) 
 Nina Repeta as Melinda 
 Matt Felten as Hamlet 
 Jonatahn Horne as Laertes 
 Troy Willlis as King Claudius 
 Kevin Savage as Jerrick

Notes

Episodes

References 

2
2014 American television seasons
2015 American television seasons